EN 10025 - Hot rolled products of structural steels refers to a set of European standards which specify the technical delivery conditions for hot rolled products of structural steels.  The standards consist of the following parts:

EN 10025-1: Part 1: General technical delivery conditions
EN 10025-2: Part 2: Technical delivery conditions for non-alloy structural steels
EN 10025-3: Part 3: Technical delivery conditions for normalized/normalized rolled weldable fine grain structural steels
EN 10025-4: Part 4: Technical delivery conditions for thermomechanical rolled weldable fine grain structural steels
EN 10025-5: Part 5: Technical delivery conditions for structural steels with improved atmospheric corrosion resistance
EN 10025-6: Part 6: Technical delivery conditions for flat products of high yield strength structural steels in the quenched and tempered condition

Editions 
 EN 10025:2019 (current version)
 EN 10025:2005 
 EN 10025:1990+A1:1993
 EN 10025:1990

See also 
List of EN standards
European Committee for Standardization
EN 1993 Eurocode 3: Design of steel structures

External links
European Committee for Standardization

10025
Structural engineering standards
Structural steel